Patrick André Leclercq (born 2 August 1938) was the Minister of State of Monaco. He was chosen by Rainier III, Prince of Monaco in December 1999, to replace Michel Lévêque, who retired a few days later. He had previously served as France's consul / ambassador to Spain, Egypt (Jordan), Montreal (Canada), as well as in the Foreign Ministry.

Patrick André Leclercq was born in Lille, attended the prestigious Lycée Janson de Sailly, and graduated from the Ecole nationale d'administration (ENA).

He was due to formally step down on 1 May 2005 and to be replaced by Jean-Paul Proust, but Proust's inauguration was deferred for a few weeks owing to the death of ruling Prince Rainier.

He was subsequently appointed to the board of the Monegasque company Société des Bains de Mer, and he holds the Order of Saint-Charles.

Honours

Foreign honours 
 
 Grand Officer of the Order of Saint-Charles (18 November 2002)

References

Rulers.org

1938 births
Living people
Sciences Po alumni
École nationale d'administration alumni
French politicians
Ministers of State of Monaco
Ambassadors of France to Spain
Ambassadors of France to Egypt
Ambassadors of France to Jordan
Lycée Janson-de-Sailly alumni
Grand Officers of the Order of Saint-Charles